The Hermitage Of The Holy Protection is a male skete under Eastern American and New York Diocese of Russian Orthodox Church Outside Russia in Buena Vista Township, New Jersey. Rector Very Reverend Abbot Tikhon (Gayfudinov). www.holyskete.com 

Founded in 1953 as parish church of Protection of Our Most Holy Lady Theotokos in Russian Cossack settlement New Kuban. The revival of the parish began after the transformation of the parish Church to the Holy Virgin Protection skete in autumn 2015. Since 2016, the skete celebrations are held every first Sunday of the month and holidays.

The skete is home to a Russian Orthodox cemetery. The brethren care for the grounds and tombstones, and those who wish can purchase land for family burial.

History 
In 1952 "Kuban Cossack Army Abroad" (Кубанское казачье войско за рубежом) created "free cossack stanitsa" New Kuban (Вольная общеказачья станица Новая Кубань). In 1953 parish of Holy Protection of the Mother of God was established, consisting primarily of Russian people who could not conceive of life and activities without their Orthodox traditions

Construction of Holy Protection Church began in 1953 with the blessing and direct participation of Archbishop Nikon (Rklitsky) of Washington & Florida. In November 1963, priest Nikolai Nekliudoff was appointed rector of the Church. In early 1964, a parish school and library were organized at the church, and a Russian cemetery founded on the parish grounds. Thanks to efforts of Fr Nikolai Nekliudoff, a stone church was built in the style of Holy Trinity Monastery in Jordanville. Frescoes for the church were completed by the renowned iconographer of the Russian Diaspora, Archimandrite Cyprian (Pyzhov) of Holy Trinity Monastery in Jordanville, NY, while the iconostasis was the work of layman Dmitry Alexandrow (later Bishop Daniel of Erie). A bell-tower with five bells acquired from Rhodesia (Africa) was built, where particularly melodious bells were made. The Cossack church became a place where hundreds of Cossack refugees would gather and work tirelessly to preserve their traditions and way of life.

In the years to follow, the church nourished not only "New Kuban", but also surrounding towns.

As the years went by, the Cossacks aged and the younger generations moved away. For many years after the repose of the last rector – Archpriest Nikolai Nekludoff – in 2004, the divine services were held very rarely, and the parish was placed under the supervision of Archpriest Liubo Milosevich of the neighboring Holy Trinity Church in Vineland. After Archpriest Nikolai Nekludoff's death his widow Adelaida Nekludoff has led prayer services. When he wasn't replaced, parishioners opted to attend Orthodox churches nearby rather than hear Mrs. Nekludoff read.

The peace and tranquility of the surroundings of the church and, with time, the decreasing number of active parishioners, has led to the realization that this location is an ideal spot for the establishment of a small monastic community. In the autumn of 2015, Metropolitan Hilarion (Kapral) of Eastern America & New York signed a directive organizing Holy Protection Male Skete at the former parish. For the community’s spiritual nourishment and rebirth, Abbot Tikhon (Gayfudinov) was assigned as rector of the skete. Among the several dozen churches founded by the Cossacks, Holy Protection Church was one of the few remaining. In connection with which Eastern American and New York Diocese made an effort to prevent its closing and to ensure its future growth.

October 14 2015 the feast of the Protection of the Mother of God, the festal Divine Liturgy was celebrated by Eastern American Diocesan secretary Archpriest Serge Lukianov, Abbot Tikhon (Gayfudinov; Skete rector),  Priest Anatoly Revitskyy (cleric of New Kuban Church), Priest Eugene Solodky, Protodeacon Leonid Roschko (cleric of St. Alexander Nevsky Diocesan Cathedral in Howell, NJ), and Deacon Dimitri Krenitsky (cleric of New Kuban Church). Faithful from Washington, New York, and New Jersey gathered at the Skete for the patronal feast day. A festal luncheon was then served for the clergy and faithful.

After twenty years, weekly divine services have resumed since February 3, 2016, of this year, and will be held on Saturdays and great feasts (Hours at 9:30 AM, Divine Liturgy at 10:00).

During the first week of Great Lent of 2016, Metropolitan Hilarion of Eastern America & New York visited Holy Protection Skete. On Wednesday the 16th and Thursday the 17th of March, he led the reading of the Great Penitential Canon of St. Andrew of Crete, co-served by skete rector Abbot  Tikhon (Gayfudinov). This was the first hierarchal service in the skete in the past 25 years, since Metropolitan Vitaly (Ustinov) served there.

References

Buena Vista Township, New Jersey
Churches in Atlantic County, New Jersey
1953 establishments in New Jersey
Russian-American culture in New Jersey